Emanuel Bernard Hart (October 27, 1809 – August 29, 1897) was an American lawyer and politician who one term served as a U.S. representative from New York from 1851 to 1853.

Early life and education 
Born in New York City, Hart attended local public schools. He later studied law and was admitted to the bar in 1868.

Career 
He engaged in mercantile pursuits.
He served as a colonel in the militia.
He served as a member of the New York City Board of Aldermen in 1845.

Congress 
Hart was elected as a Democrat to the Thirty-second Congress (March 4, 1851 – March 3, 1853). Hart was New York's first Jewish congressman.

Later career and death 
He was later appointed by President James Buchanan to serve as surveyor of the Port of New York from 1857 to 1861. He also served as member of the city board of assessors. He served as president of Mount Sinai Hospital from 1870 to 1876 and New York City's commissioner of immigration from 1870 to 1873. He also worked as treasurer of the Society for the Relief of Poor Hebrews. He was a presidential elector in 1868.

Hart died in New York City on August 29, 1897. He was interred in Cypress Hills Cemetery, Brooklyn, New York.

See also
List of Jewish members of the United States Congress

References

1809 births
1897 deaths
Burials at Cypress Hills Cemetery
New York City Council members
New York (state) lawyers
Democratic Party members of the United States House of Representatives from New York (state)
Jewish members of the United States House of Representatives
19th-century American politicians
1868 United States presidential electors
19th-century American lawyers